Tawfiq Ali Abuhammad (born 8 November 1989) is a Palestinian footballer who plays as a goalkeeper for the Palestine national football team and Tarji Wadi Al-Nes in the West Bank Premier League.

He received his first senior cap in the bronze medal match of the 2011 Pan Arab Games against Kuwait. His first clean sheet as national team goalkeeper came on 29 February 2012 in a friendly against Azerbaijan, that ended with a 2–0 win for Palestine.

References

External links

1989 births
Living people
Palestinian footballers
Palestine international footballers
Taraji Wadi Al-Nes players
Shabab Al-Khalil SC players
2015 AFC Asian Cup players
Footballers at the 2010 Asian Games
People from Gaza City
Association football goalkeepers
2019 AFC Asian Cup players
Asian Games competitors for Palestine
Palestine youth international footballers
West Bank Premier League players